Cephalocladia werneri is a moth of the family Megalopygidae. It was described by Walter Hopp in 1927. It is found in Colombia.

References

Moths described in 1927
Megalopygidae